Tenthill may refer to:

 Lower Tenthill, Queensland, a locality in the Lockyer Valley Region, Queensland, Australia
 Upper Tenthill, Queensland, a locality in the Lockyer Valley Region, Queensland, Australia